Idrettsforeningen Skarp is a Norwegian association football club from Tromsø, which currently plays in the Third Division, the fourth tier of Norwegian football. The club was founded 30 June 1919 and its colors are black and white. It is the third best football team in Tromsø, after Tromsø IL and Tromsdalen UIL.

Football
The men's team played in the Second Division for many years, but was relegated after the 2008 season. In 2010 it contested a playoff to win promotion, and succeeded by beating Kirkenes IF 7–4 on aggregate. In 2011, Skarp finished last in their Second Division group, and was again relegated.

Recent history 
{|class="wikitable"
|-bgcolor="#efefef"
! Season
! 
! Pos.
! Pl.
! W
! D
! L
! GS
! GA
! P
!Cup
!Notes
|-
|2006
|D2
|align=right |12
|align=right|26||align=right|9||align=right|2||align=right|15
|align=right|46||align=right|73||align=right|29
|2nd round
|
|-
|2007
|D2
|align=right |11
|align=right|26||align=right|9||align=right|2||align=right|15
|align=right|45||align=right|70||align=right|29
|1st round
|
|-
|2008
|D2
|align=right  bgcolor=red|13
|align=right|26||align=right|5||align=right|0||align=right|21
|align=right|28||align=right|83||align=right|15
||2nd round
|Relegated
|-
|2009
|D3
|align=right bgcolor=silver|2
|align=right|22||align=right|16||align=right|4||align=right|2
|align=right|93||align=right|30||align=right|52
||1st round
|
|-
|2010
|D3
|align=right bgcolor=gold|1
|align=right|22||align=right|19||align=right|1||align=right|2
|align=right|98||align=right|22||align=right|58
||1st qualifying round
|Promoted
|-
|2011
|D2
|align=right bgcolor=red|14
|align=right|26||align=right|2||align=right|5||align=right|19
|align=right|29||align=right|85||align=right|11
||2nd round
|Relegated
|-
|2012
|D3
|align=right |7
|align=right|22||align=right|8||align=right|3||align=right|11
|align=right|64||align=right|56||align=right|27
||1st qualifying round
|
|-
|2013 (in progress)
|D3
|align=right |5
|align=right|18||align=right|8||align=right|2||align=right|8
|align=right|48||align=right|44||align=right|26
||1st round
|
|}

Other sports
The club was formerly active in athletics. Kaare Meidell-Sundal won the Norwegian championships in hammer throw in 1939 (silver medal in 1938), and took a bronze medal in the shot put in 1939. Kaare Nerdrum also won a bronze medal in the 800 metres in 1930.

References

External links
 Official site 
 Skarpmarka Kunstgress - Nordic Stadiums

Football clubs in Norway
Sport in Tromsø
Association football clubs established in 1919
1919 establishments in Norway
Defunct athletics clubs in Norway